Andriy Kondzyolka (born March 16, 1983) is a Ukrainian footballer.

Career 
Kondzyolka began his career in 2002 with FC Ternopil Nyva-2 in the Ukrainian Second League. In 2012, he played with FC Ternopil, and secured a promotion to the Ukrainian First League in 2014. In 2017, he played abroad in the Canadian Soccer League with FC Ukraine United. In his debut season he assisted FC Ukraine in achieving a perfect season, and claimed the CSL Second Division Championship.

References 

1983 births
Living people
Ukrainian footballers
FC Ternopil players
FC Ukraine United players
Canadian Soccer League (1998–present) players
Association football defenders
Ukrainian First League players
Ukrainian Second League players